The following lists events from 1879 in Afghanistan.

Incumbents 
 Monarch – Sher Ali Khan (until February 21), Ayub Khan (starting October 12)

Events

February 
February 21: Amir Sher Ali Khan dies in Mazar-i-Sharif, leaving the throne to his son, Mohammad Yaqub Khan.

May 
May 26: Afghan and British leaders sign the Treaty of Gandamak during the Second Anglo-Afghan War. The treaty cedes parts of the Afghan frontier to Britain.

October 
October 12: Mohammad Yaqub Khan abdicates and takes refuge in the British camp near Kabul.

See also 
History of Afghanistan

References 

 
Afghanistan
Years of the 19th century in Afghanistan
Afghanistan
1870s in Afghanistan